John Kelly (born 1959) is an American performance artist, visual artist and writer.

His work first gained notoriety in the 1980s East Village art scene, and in the last 40 years Kelly has received two Bessie Awards, two Obie Awards, two NEA American Masterpiece Awards, an American Choreographer Award, a Herb Alpert Award in the Arts (CalArts), a Visual AIDS Vanguard Award, and an Ethyl Eichelberger Award. His work has been presented at Lincoln Center and Brooklyn Academy of Music.

He is a MacDowell Colony fellow.

Career
John Kelly began his performance career in New York's Lower East Side in the 1980s at clubs such as Limbo Lounge, Pyramid Club, and Club 57. Since then, his works have been performed at The Kitchen, La MaMa, PS 122, New York Live Arts, the Joyce Theater, Dance Theater Workshop, Danspace Project, Museum of Modern Art, Tate Modern, Whitney Museum of American Art, The Andy Warhol Museum, PS 1, Walker Art Center. Commissions include BAM’s Next Wave Festival, Lincoln Center, and MASS MoCA. ‘John Kelly, a Visual Autobiography', was published by 2wice Arts Foundation in association with Aperture.

Kelly is described as a countertenor singer, whose vocal range extends from a male alto (that he mostly sings in) to a much lower baritone.

According to Elisabeth Vincentelli (in The New York Times), "If the protean Mr. Kelly has had one recurring theme through the years, it is the shaping of the self through art. In his new show at La MaMa, “Time No Line,” the subject is himself — but then, hasn’t it always been, even when refracted through the creations of others?"

Kelly's work is notable for a number of performances where he channeled Joni Mitchell. In several works, Kelly performed an entire concert piece as Mitchell. The two artists met in 1996.

Performance works

  ‘DOWN TO YOU: John Kelly Sings Joni Mitchell’ (2017)
  ‘Time No Line’ (2017)
  ‘Beauty Kills Me’ (2016)
  ‘Love of a Poet’ (2015)
  ‘Escape Artist Redux’ (2014)
  ‘Rebel Songs of A Range Queen’ (2013)
  ‘Caravaggio Songs: Music From The Escape Artist’ (2013)
  ‘Muse Ascending A Staircase’ (2012)
  ‘John Kelly & Dargelos’ (2012)
  ‘The Escape Artist’ (2011)
  ‘Find My Way Home’ (2011)
  ‘Cohesion’ (2010)
  ‘Pass The Blutwurst, Bitte  (2010)
  ‘Paved Paradise Redux’ (2009/10)
  ‘Songs For A Shiny Hot Night: Joni Mitchell’s Court And Spark’ (2008)
  ‘Dargelos at Bar 13’ (2008)
  ‘Cara Viaggio’ (2007)
  ‘Music For Romanians’ (2007)
  ‘Mrs. Hamlet’ (2006)
  ‘21st Century Vox’ (2006)
  ‘Shiny Hot Nights’ (2002/05)
  ‘The Skin I’m In’ (2004)
  ‘Get Up And Jive’ (2003)
  ‘The Paradise Project’ (2002)
  ‘Brother’ (2001)
  ‘Moondrunk’ (1999)
  ‘Café Bluebeard Hof’ (1999)
  ‘Sing Low Sweet Love’ (1998)
  ‘Life Of Cruelty’ (1998)
  ‘Find My Way Home (1998)
  ‘Paved Paradise’ (1997)
  ’20th Century Vox’ (1996)
  ‘Constant Stranger’ (1995)
  ‘Pass The Blutwurst, Bitte’ (1995)
  ‘Far Cry From Bliss’ (1994)
  ‘Light Shall Lift Them’ (1993)
  ‘I Want Your Myth’ (1993)
  ‘Akin: True But Dour’ (1992)
  ‘Arias I Love’ (1992)
  ‘Divine Promiscue’ (1992)
  ‘Down In The Mouth’ (1991)
  ‘Her Tender Moment’ (1991)
  ‘Love Of A Poet’ (1990)
  ‘The Dagmar Onassis Story’ (1990)
  ‘Cupid And Death’ (1990)
  ‘Maybe It’s Cold Outside’ (1990)
  ‘Ode To A Cube’ (1988)
  ‘Find My Way Home’ (1988)
  ‘Born With The Moon In Cancer’ (1986)
  ‘Pass The Blutwurst, Bitte’ (1986)
  ‘Diary Of A Somnambulist’ (1985/86)
  ‘Go West Junger Mann’ (1985)
  ‘John Kelly Sings’ (1985)
  ‘Long Live The Knife’ (1985)

Awards and honors
2017 National Endowment for the Arts, Grant, for ‘Time No Line’
2012 GLAAD Media Award for Outstanding New York Theater: Off-Off Broadway ‘The Escape Artist’, book by John Kelly, songs by John Kelly & Carol Lipnik
2011 NEA American Masterpieces Award, for ‘Find My Way Home’
2010 Visual AIDS Vanguard Award
2010 Ethyl Eichelberger Award
2010 NEA American Masterpieces Award, for ‘Pass The Blutwurst, Bitte‘
2006-07 Rome Prize in Visual Art, American Academy In Rome
2001 Cal/Arts Alpert Award, in Dance/Performance
1991 Obie Award
1989 John Simon Guggenheim Foundation Fellowship
1988 Bessie Award
1987 Obie Award
1987 American Choreographer Award
1986 Bessie Award

References

External links
 Website for John Kelly

American performance artists
Living people
1959 births
Bessie Award winners
Obie Award recipients
MacDowell Colony fellows